Pattersons is a village in Saint Paul Parish, Antigua and Barbuda.

Demographics 
Pattersons has one enumeration district, ED 72600.

Census Data (2011)

Individual

Household 
There are 149 households in Pattersons.

References 

Populated places in Antigua and Barbuda
Saint Paul Parish, Antigua and Barbuda